Meekoceras is a genus of ceratitid ammonites with a discoidal shell that lived during the Early Triassic Epoch.

Description
Meekoceras is characterized by a compressed, discoidal, evolute or involute shell with flattened sides and narrow, flattened or rounded venter that is without keels or furrows. The surface is smooth or with lateral folds, but no tubercles, spines, or spiral ridges. Umbilicus variable, body chamber short. Sutures ceratitic with smooth rounded saddles and serrated lobes.

Taxonomic position
Smith (1932) and Arkell et al. (1957) included Meekoceras in the Meekoceratidae, which was named to contain the genus. Different approaches were made regarding the next taxonomic level. Arkell, et al. (1957) includes Meekoceratidae in the Noritacdeae while Smith (1932) included them in the Prolecanitoidea.

Wyoningites and Svalbardiceras are related genera.

References 

 Arkell, W.J. et al., 1957. Mesozoic Ammonoidea. Treatise on Invertebrate Paleontology Part L. Geological Society and University of Kansas Press. 
Smith, J.P. 1932. Lower Triassic Ammonoids of North America. US Geological Survey Professional Paper 167.

Meekoceratidae
Ammonites of North America
Ceratitida genera
Triassic ammonites